In geometry, the great stellated  120-cell or great stellated polydodecahedron is a regular star 4-polytope with Schläfli symbol {5/2,3,5}. It is one of 10 regular Schläfli-Hess polytopes.

It is one of four regular star 4-polytopes discovered by Ludwig Schläfli. It is named by John Horton Conway, extending the naming system by Arthur Cayley for the Kepler-Poinsot solids.

Related polytopes 

It has the same edge arrangement as the grand 600-cell, icosahedral 120-cell, and the same face arrangement as the grand stellated 120-cell.

See also 
 List of regular polytopes
 Convex regular 4-polytope
 Kepler-Poinsot solids - regular star polyhedron
 Star polygon - regular star polygons

References 
 Edmund Hess, (1883) Einleitung in die Lehre von der Kugelteilung mit besonderer Berücksichtigung ihrer Anwendung auf die Theorie der Gleichflächigen und der gleicheckigen Polyeder .
H. S. M. Coxeter, Regular Polytopes, 3rd. ed., Dover Publications, 1973. .
 John H. Conway, Heidi Burgiel, Chaim Goodman-Strass, The Symmetries of Things 2008,  (Chapter 26, Regular Star-polytopes, pp. 404–408)

External links 
 Regular polychora 
 Discussion on names
 Reguläre Polytope
 The Regular Star Polychora
 Paper model of 3D cross-section of Great Stellated 120-cell created using nets generated by Stella4D software

4-polytopes